The Powell PH Racer was a 1920s air racer which held the distinction of having won all the races it entered.

Design and development
The aircraft was designed by Professor C.H. Powell, teacher at the Aeronautics Department of the University of Detroit.

The biplane racer used an all-wood fuselage with birch paneling. The wing spars were also wood with fabric covering. Uniquely, the aileron hinges were made of leather.

Operational history

Race Winnings
1925 National Air Races piloted by Jerry V. Dack of Dayton, Ohio
Aero Digest Trophy (Dack)
The Dayton Daily News Trophy
The Scientific American Trophy

The Powell Racer was returned to the University of Detroit where it was destroyed in static load tests.

Variants
Shirlen Big Cootie A set of plans were drawn up for the Powell PH Racer, using steel tubing for the fuselage.

Specifications (Powell Racer)

References

Racing aircraft
Homebuilt aircraft